Crime in Saudi Arabia is relatively low compared to industrialized nations. Criminal activity does not typically target foreigners and is mostly drug-related. Petty crime such as pickpocketing and bag snatching does occur, but is extremely uncommon. During the period of Hajj in the holy city of Mecca, there have been growing incidents of pickpocketing, especially with women pickpockets becoming an increasing phenomenon. Although incidents of violence are generally considered to be rare, violence has occurred more frequently due to economic pressures on expatriate workers during the last few years. In 2013, the number of crime cases reported by the Ministry of Justice was 22,113, a 102% increase over 2012.

Background

Reporting
According to the US State Department Overseas Security Advisory Council (OSAC) as of 2014, "U.S. citizens and Westerners continue to report incidents of crime, including robberies and attempted robberies." Cases of sexual assault are believed to be underreported "because victims are customarily blamed". (For example, in 2009, a 23-year-old woman was sentenced to a year in prison and 100 lashes for adultery after being raped by five men. In 2007, a 19-year-old victim of rape by seven men receiving a sentence of six-months in jail and 200 lashes.)

History
While as late as the 1980s the kingdom boasted of being "practically crime-free," the crime rate among jobless youth grew by 320% from 1990 to 1996.  
Convictions for drug possession rose from 4,279 in 1986 to 17,199 in 2001. Credited with rising crime are a "population boom, rapid social change, and massive unemployment" leading to "a breakdown in traditional forms of social control and constraint.

Types of crime

Theft
Petty theft is a problem especially in crowded areas. The nation has strict laws prohibiting drug trafficking; drug trafficking is a capital crime. Despite strict laws, however, illicit trafficking takes place in considerable amounts through underground channels especially marijuana, cocaine and homegrown psychedelic drugs. Saudi Arabia is a signatory to all three international conventions on drug control. To curb money laundering, improved anti-money laundering laws have been enacted. The country has implemented all the forty recommendations of the Financial Action Task Force on Money Laundering (FATF) for combating money laundering and all eight recommendations of the FATF regarding terror financing. A Financial Intelligence Unit exists for the purpose of monitoring flows of funds.

The most common crime in 2002 was theft, which accounted for 47% of total reported crime.

Terrorism

Threat of Islamic terrorism is a matter of concern. Saudi Arabia has seen many terrorist attacks on its soil. In 1996, Hezbollah Al-Hejaz attacked a building in the oil-industry town of Khobar, killing 19 people. Various Iranian groups have also tried to wreak havoc in Saudi Arabia. During the 9/11 plane crashes, it was revealed that most of the terrorists were from Saudi Arabia. From 2000 to 2004, when a number of expatriate workers were killed in car bombings, questions arose over the seriousness and sincerity of Saudi efforts to prevent or investigate attacks. Before May 2003, the only public statements of any investigation or prosecution of attacks were Saudi accusations against the (mainly British) western expatriates themselves. Saudis arrested and detained several, claiming they were 'alcohol traders' fighting a turf war over the illegal distribution of alcohol.  According to author Thomas Hegghammer, "today, few outside Saudi Arabia believe that alcohol traders carried out the bombings", as the suspects were well-paid professionals with no prior record of violent crime, no forensic evidence was provided against them, and attacks of a very similar nature on western nationals  continued despite the arrests of the alleged perpetrators.

After 26 foreigners were killed in a May 2003 attack by three car bombs on foreign residential compounds in Riyadh,   American intelligence sources quoted by The Daily Telegraph, stated the operation "depended on a significant level of `insider` knowledge of the compounds," and this and other evidence indicates that al-Qaeda has infiltrated even the elite National Guard, which was involved in compound security. Bombers wore uniforms of security forces, in both the May 2003 compound bombing and another in November.

In May 2004, militants took dozens of hostages attacking three buildings in Khobar over a 25-hour period killing 22 people and injuring 25 — mainly foreign workers — killing one victim by tying him to the back of a vehicle and dragging him through the street. Despite being surrounded by Saudi security, three of the four gunmen escaped.
 
While attacks by militants have decreased dramatically since late 2004, there are continued reports of terrorist planning. The Department of Foreign Affairs and Trade (DFAT) of the Government of Australia claimed they received reports that terrorists are masterminding attacks against assets belonging to the Government of Saudi Arabia, oil infrastructure, aviation infrastructure, embassies, hotels, shopping malls and many Western interests such as residential housing complexes, gatherings of foreign tourists for recreational or cultural activities etc. The United States Department of State reported "There is an on-going security threat due to the continued presence of terrorist  groups, some affiliated with al Qaida, who may target Western interests, housing compounds, and other facilities where Westerners congregate". Terrorist attacks in the country targeted both native people and foreigners. DFAT further stated "Terrorist attacks could occur at any time, anywhere in Saudi Arabia, including in Riyadh, Khobar, and other major cities".

The kingdom has taken successful efforts to rehabilitate terrorists. Saudi Arabia has the best terrorist rehabilitation program in the world. Their terrorist recidivism rate is about 3 to 4%. In order to have such a low terrorist recidivism rate, the Saudi Arabian's well-designed strategies to counter the effects new terrorist recruits endure during indoctrination to a terrorist organization. The effects that Saudi Arabia terrorist rehabilitation program targets are as follows: authorization, isolation, training, and dehumanization. By knowing these steps, the rehabilitation programs reverse the effects of the terrorist authorization, isolation, dehumanization, and training to become successful in criminal rehabilitation. The rehabilitation programs help violent offenders positively reintegrate in the free society by supporting the creation of positive peer and familial relationships. These programs help to reconnect family with the offender or aid in the creation of a family.

Murder
In 1988, the reported murder rate in Saudi Arabia was .011 per 100,000 population, sexual offenses were .059 per 100,000 population, and thefts were .005 per 100,000. In 2015, the UN office of drugs and crime reported the murder rate in Saudi Arabia to be 1.5 per 100,000, with 472 recorded offences, a higher rate than countries which do not practice draconian and cruel criminal punishments

Religious crimes
The Saudi legal system is based on Sharia or Islamic law and thus often prohibits many activities that are not crimes in other nations,  such as alcohol or pork consumption, public displays of non-Islamic religious symbols or text, affection between opposite sex outside of marriage, "indecent" artwork or media images, sorcery, homosexuality, cross-dressing, and fornication or adultery.
Some Western countries and human rights advocates criticize the Saudi corrections system for the manner in which offenders are punished. The article "Islamic Law Across Cultural Borders: The Involvement of Western Nationals in Saudi Murder Trials" by Esmaeili & Gans (2000), discussed several important points regarding the three major types of punishments established under Sharia law. These three are "Hudud" (limit or boundary), "Qisas" "retaliation", and "Tazirat" "discretionary punishments" (Esmaeili & Gans, 2000, p. 153).  These punishments "are fixed by the Quran and Sunnah and cannot be altered by any judicial authority" (Esmaeili & Gans, 2000, p. 153).

The first punishment called Hudud (limit or boundary) includes life imprisonment. Despite its potential for harshness, punishment through Hudud is imposed incrementally and under community supervision.

The second punishment called Qisas (retaliation) is reserved for crimes of violence such as murder and assault. Esmaeili and Gans (2000) stated that "the courts have no initial sentencing role" because Qisas follows an eye-for-an-eye justice of retaliation, meaning that "the offender is punished in the same way, and by the same means, as the crime that she or he committed" (p. 153).  Thus the penalty for murder is death and for assault is a beating.

The third punishment is called Tazirat (discretionary punishments) and it depends on the severity of the crime (Esmaeili & Gans, 2000). In this category the King's approval is not required as in the previous categories. So, if a person commits any sin which violates Islamic law, the judge can punish him or her. Practicing Tazirat includes punishments such as "lashing, prison, or banishment, is specified in written form" (Esmaeili & Gans, 2000, p. 153).

People have been punished for criticising religions especially Islam.

Other crimes

People cannot criticise the government of Saudi Arabia. The government will take this very seriously. There is limited freedom of expression

See also

 Capital punishment in Saudi Arabia
 Legal system of Saudi Arabia
 Censorship in Saudi Arabia

References

Sources